Face 2 Face is the debut album by 2face Idibia.  It was released on May 15, 2004. It became a major hit (sold up to 2 million copies), initially in Idibia's home country of Nigeria, but quickly spreading through western and southern Africa, and eventually making an impact in Europe as well.  Its success owed much to lead radio track "African Queen", a guitar ballad with elements of West African folk music and hip-hop.  "Nfana Ibaga" also became a local hit.

Track listing

Nigerian edition
 "Intro"  – 1:06
 "Nfana Ibaga" ("No Problem") – 4:24
 "Ole" ("Thief") ft. Freestyle – 4:49
 "Right Here" – 4:46
 "Holy" (skit) – 0:15
 "U No Holy Pass" – 4:54
 "African Queen" – 4:20
 "Police" (skit) – 0:24
 "Keep On Rockin' " ft. Natives & Lil Seal – 5:43
 "Thank U Lord"  – 4:25
 "Odi Ya" ft. Blackface  – 4:37

South African edition
Released on January 27, 2006, through EMI. It contained the same track list as the Nigerian edition, but with added 6 bonus tracks of remixes and various versions.

Face 2 Face
2face Idibia albums